Goose Creek High School is a public high school located in Goose Creek, South Carolina, United States. It is a part of the Berkeley County School District.

Goose Creek High School offers grades 9–12. It is a public high school, and was founded in 1970.

Athletics
As of 2012, sports offered at Goose Creek High include baseball, boys' basketball, girls' basketball, cheerleading, cross country, football, track and field, soccer, softball, swimming, girls' tennis, girls' volleyball, and wrestling.

State championships
2009 – boys basketball
2011 – varsity football
2012 – girls basketball

Notable alumni 

 Javon Kinlaw – National Football League (NFL) defensive tackle for the San Francisco 49ers.
 Brandon Shell – NFL offensive tackle for the Seattle Seahawks

References

External links 
 

Educational institutions established in 1970
1970 establishments in South Carolina
Public high schools in South Carolina
Schools in Berkeley County, South Carolina
Education in Goose Creek, South Carolina
Goose Creek, South Carolina